Armand Bénédic (26 August 1875 – 26 October 1960) was a French curler. He was born in Paris. He won a bronze medal at the 1924 Winter Olympics in Chamonix.

References

External links

1875 births
1962 deaths
French male curlers
Olympic curlers of France
Olympic bronze medalists for France
Curlers at the 1924 Winter Olympics
Medalists at the 1924 Winter Olympics
Sportspeople from Paris